Badalan or Badelan may refer to:
 Bədəlan, Azerbaijan
 Badalan, Iran
 Badalan, Khuzestan, Iran